Iranian Women's Futsal League competitions are the highest level of women's futsal club competitions in Iran. The first round of the Women's Premier League was held in 2005.

The first division of the country's women's football league was planned with the presence of 8 teams from the second half of 2003. Before that, the country's women's futsal competitions were held. In the 2003 women's futsal tournament, the four teams of Esteghlal Tehran, Dehim Ahvaz Municipality, Payam Noavaran Nowshahr and Tejaratkhaneh-e-Junub met in the final stage in May 2003 at the Azadi Complex Women's Sports Hall to win the championship.

History of Iranian Women's Futsal League

Before the start of the Futsal Premier League 
In the first stage of the indoor soccer competitions of the first division of the country's clubs, in April 2003, the team of South Hormozgan Trading House became the champion. These competitions were held in the presence of 4 teams from Peykan Tehran, Southern Chamber of Commerce, Ahvaz Municipality and Kermanshah Industry in Bandar Abbas Medical Sciences Hall.

Women's Futsal Premier League

References 

Futsal in Iran
Iranian Women's Futsal Premier League
Futsal leagues in Iran